Josef Müller (27 March 1898 – 12 September 1979), also known as "Ochsensepp" (“Joe Ox”), was a German politician. He was a member of the resistance during World War II and afterwards one of the founders of the Christian Social Union (CSU). He was a devout Catholic and a leading figure in the Catholic resistance to Hitler.

Early life 
Born in Steinwiesen, Upper Franconia, Müller was a lifelong Catholic. He entered the legal profession after serving as a mortar-man on the Western Front from 1916 to 1919.  He was discharged as a senior sergeant.

Müller became politically active during the Weimar Republic as a member of the Bavarian People's Party.

Third Reich 
During the Nazi period he worked as an attorney defending many Nazi opponents. He also was part of the Catholic resistance and was in contact with resistance figures in the Abwehr (German military intelligence) such as Admiral Canaris, Hans von Dohnanyi and Hans Oster.

Missions to Rome

Early in the war (1939–1940), Müller made a number of trips to the Vatican under the identity "X". He carried correspondence between the German resistance and British intelligence that sought co-operation in a coup to replace Hitler's regime with an anti-Nazi civilian government supported by the German military. The correspondence and related intelligence passed through an intermediary to the hands of Pope Pius XII, who would review it and in turn forward it to Lord Halifax in Britain. Dohnanyi summarized the material into a report, containing list of individuals slated to assume roles in a post-coup civilian government. Despite Müller's urgings, Dohnanyi failed to destroy this document and during the purges following the failed assassination attempt on Hitler in July 1944, it fell into the hands of the Gestapo, which led to the arrests, trials and executions of many resistance members.

The Pope's Private Secretary, Robert Leiber, acted as the intermediary for Pius and met with Müller, who visited Rome in 1939 and 1940. The Vatican considered Müller to be a representative of Colonel-General Beck and agreed to offer the machinery for mediation between the German Resistance and the Allies. Hans Oster, Wilhelm Canaris and Hans von Dohnányi, backed by Beck, told Müller to ask Pius to ascertain whether the British would enter negotiations with the German opposition which wanted to overthrow Hitler. The British agreed to negotiate, provided the Vatican could vouch for the opposition's representative. Pius, communicating with Britain's Francis d'Arcy Osborne, channelled communications back and forth in secrecy. The Vatican agreed to send a letter outlining the basis for peace with England and the participation of the Pope was used to try to persuade senior German Generals Halder and Brauchitsch to act against Hitler. Negotiations were tense, with a Western offensive expected, and on the basis that substantive negotiations could only follow the replacement of the Hitler regime. The British government had doubts as to the capacity of the conspirators. Nevertheless, the resistance were encouraged by the talks, and Muller told Leiber that a coup would occur in February. Pius appeared to continue to hope for a coup in Germany into March 1940. The negotiations ultimately proved fruitless. Hitler's swift victories over France and the Low Countries deflated the will of the German military to resist Hitler. Muller was arrested during the Nazis first raid on Military Intelligence in 1943. He spent the rest of the war in concentration camps, ending up at Dachau.

Imprisonment

After his arrest in 1943 he was interned at the concentration camp Flossenbürg. Unlike fellow inmates Canaris, Oster and Bonhoeffer, who were executed in April 1945, Müller was spared at the last moment, at the foot of the scaffold, through the intervention of Johann Rattenhuber who convinced Ernst Kaltenbrunner that keeping Müller alive might help Germany negotiate more favourable surrender terms. Instead, Müller was transferred to Tyrol in late April 1945 along with 138 other "special prisoners" (Sonderhäftlinge) and "kin prisoners" (Sippenhäftlinge), persons of prominence the Nazi SS had hauled off in the final days of the war to Niederdorf, South Tyrol, where they were to be hidden and used as bargaining chips. They were liberated by the Fifth U.S. Army on 5 May 1945.

Later life 
After the war, he advocated forming a new Christian party of both Catholics and Protestants. With Adam Stegerwald, he was one of the founders of the Christian Social Union (CSU), serving as the party's first chairman from 1946 to 1949. Müller belonged to the more liberal wing of the party and was the main opponent of the more conservative wing under Alois Hundhammer. He was one of the patrons of the young Franz Josef Strauß.

After the CSU had won the first postwar elections in 1946, Hundhammer opposed Müller's nomination as minister-president of Bavaria and proposed for Hans Ehard to be elected as a compromise candidate instead. Once elected, Ehard appointed Hundhammer as minister of culture, but in 1947, Müller entered the cabinet as well as minister of justice. From 1950 onwards, he also was deputy prime minister. He resigned from the government in 1952.

He died on 12 September 1979, in Munich.

References

Further reading 
 : Die CSU. Anatomie einer konservativen Partei 1945–1972. Opladen 1975 (in German).

External links
 

1898 births
1979 deaths
People from Kronach (district)
People from the Kingdom of Bavaria
German Roman Catholics
Bavarian People's Party politicians
Ministers of the Bavaria State Government
Christian Social Union in Bavaria politicians
Union of Persecutees of the Nazi Regime members
20th-century German lawyers
Roman Catholics in the German Resistance
German conservatives in the German Resistance
Knights Commander of the Order of Merit of the Federal Republic of Germany